Soldans på din grammofon is a compilation album by Gyllene Tider, released on 3 July 2013. It was also released as a vinyl LP.

Track listing
Sommartider
Gå & fiska!
En sten vid en sjö i en skog
Flickorna på TV2
(Dansar inte lika bra som) sjömän
När vi två blir en
Det hjärta som brinner
(Kom så ska vi) Leva livet
Det är över nu
Kung av sand
Marie i växeln (Switchboard Susan), Rockfile
Tylö Sun (California Sun)
Tuffa tider (för en drömmare)
Billy
Skicka ett vykort, älskling (Send Me a Postcard)
Juni, juli, augusti
Flickan i en Cole Porter-sång
Ljudet av ett annat hjärta
(Hon vill ha) puls
Småstad
Ska vi älska, så ska vi älska till Buddy Holly
Vandrar i ett sommarregn
Faller ner på knä
När alla vännerna gått hem 
(Henry, dansa inte disco (en 70-talsfabel) 
45 minuter motorväg 
SOS (live, rehearsal, June 1980) 
Henry, dansa inte disco (live rehearsal, January 1980)

Charts

References 

2013 compilation albums
Gyllene Tider compilation albums